Sir Charles Anthony Haddon-Cave (born 20 March 1956), styled The Rt Hon Lord Justice Haddon-Cave, is a British judge of the Court of Appeal of England and Wales and is the Senior Presiding Judge for England and Wales.

Haddon-Cave was called to the Bar (Gray's Inn) in 1978, and elected a bencher in 2003. He was called to the Bar in Hong Kong in 1980. Haddon-Cave took silk in 1999, and served as an assistant recorder from 1998 to 2000. He then served as a recorder until his appointment to the High Court on 31 October 2011, upon which occasion he was knighted.

Haddon-Cave is the son of Sir Charles Philip Haddon-Cave, Chief Secretary of Hong Kong between 1981 and 1985, and elder brother of Francis, who was called to the Hong Kong bar in 1999.

Haddon-Cave led a review into the 2006 RAF Nimrod crash.

He sentenced the Parsons Green bomber to a minimum of 34 years in prison in 2018. He said, "You will have plenty of time to study the Koran in Prison… the Koran is a book of peace… Islam forbids breaking the law of the land…..Islam forbids terror."
He was appointed to the Court of Appeal in 2018. He was sworn as a member of the Privy Council of the United Kingdom in 2018, giving him the honorific title "The Right Honourable".

Haddon-Cave is an uncle of the actresses Jessie Cave and Bebe Cave.

See also
 List of High Court judges of England and Wales
Parsons Green train bombing

References

1956 births
Living people
People educated at The King's School, Canterbury
Alumni of Pembroke College, Cambridge
21st-century English judges
English King's Counsel
Knights Bachelor
Lords Justices of Appeal
Members of the Privy Council of the United Kingdom
Members of Gray's Inn
Queen's Bench Division judges
20th-century King's Counsel
21st-century King's Counsel